"I'm OK" is a song by Russian punk-pop-rave group Little Big. The song was released on 14 June 2019 by Warner Music Russia and Little Big Family.

Music video 
The music video was released as the same time as the single. The action in the video takes place at a bar. Ilya comes to the bar, drinks alcohol and tries to meet a girl, but fails. In parallel with him, Sonya Tayurskaya is trying to get a man, but fails as well. By the end of the video, they both end up together. In addition to the band members, other celebrities make appearances in the video, such as Yuri Muzychenko (frontman of The Hatters), Arseniy Popov (participant in the Improvisational show 'Импровизация'), Nikolai Kiselev (co-owner of the El copitas bar, which is in the top 30 bars in the world), among many others.. The video was directed by Ilya Prusikin and Alina Pyazok. During the first day, the video collected about 5 million views and took first position in the YouTube trends in Russia. The popularity of the clip spawned a new flash mob from Little Big.

Awards and nominations

Personnel 

 Ilya "Ilyich" Prusikin – vocals
 Sofia Tayurskaya – vocals

Production 

 The Hatters – producer
 Denis Zukerman – producer
 Victor Sibrinin – producer
 Ilya Prusikin – producer
 Anastasia Antipova – executive producer

References 

Little Big (band) songs
2019 songs
Songs written by Ilya Prusikin